Ezequiel Paulón (born January 4, 1976 in Puerto Deseado, Santa Cruz) is a field hockey defender from Argentina who twice represented his country in the Olympics, in 2000 and the 2004.

References

External links

1976 births
Living people
People from Puerto Deseado
Argentine male field hockey players
Male field hockey defenders
Olympic field hockey players of Argentina
Field hockey players at the 2000 Summer Olympics
2002 Men's Hockey World Cup players
Field hockey players at the 2004 Summer Olympics
2006 Men's Hockey World Cup players
Pan American Games gold medalists for Argentina
Pan American Games silver medalists for Argentina
Pan American Games medalists in field hockey
Field hockey players at the 1999 Pan American Games
Field hockey players at the 2003 Pan American Games
Medalists at the 1999 Pan American Games
Medalists at the 2003 Pan American Games
20th-century Argentine people
21st-century Argentine people